Princeton Public Schools (PPS) is a comprehensive community public school district that serves students in pre-kindergarten through twelfth grade from Princeton, in Mercer County, New Jersey, United States. Students from Cranbury Township attend the district's high school as part of a sending/receiving relationship. The district administration building is at 25 Valley Road in Princeton.

As of the 2020–21 school year, the district, comprised of six schools, had an enrollment of 3,740 students and 341.0 classroom teachers (on an FTE basis), for a student–teacher ratio of 11.0:1.

The district is classified by the New Jersey Department of Education as being in District Factor Group "I", the second-highest of eight groupings. District Factor Groups organize districts statewide to allow comparison by common socioeconomic characteristics of the local districts. From lowest socioeconomic status to highest, the categories are A, B, CD, DE, FG, GH, I and J.

Residents of Princeton University's housing complexes for graduate students with families, Butler Apartments, Lawrence Apartments, and Stanworth Apartments, are zoned to the district.

History
The district's high school was constructed in 1927 and the middle school in 1965. The four elementary schools were completed from 1957 to 1962.

Awards, recognition, and rankings 
Niche ranked Princeton Public Schools as the 16th best school district in America and the best school district in New Jersey in its "2021 Best School Districts" rankings.

Littlebrook School was one of nine public schools recognized in 2017 as Blue Ribbon Schools by the United States Department of Education.

In 2000-01, the district was recognized by the New Jersey Department of Education with the Best Practices award for its Jefferson Debates Citizenship / Character Education program for students in Grades 6-8.

Schools

Schools in the district (with 2020–21 enrollment data from the National Center for Education Statistics) are:

Elementary Schools
Community Park School with 332 students in grades K-5
Dineen Gruchacz, Principal
Johnson Park School with 329 students in grades PreK-5
Angela Siso Stentz, Principal
Littlebrook School with 342 students in grades K-5
Luis Ramirez, Principal
Riverside School with 289 students in grades PreK-5
Nancy Whalen, Principal
Middle School
Princeton Middle School  with 803 students in grades 6-8
Jason Burr, Principal
High School
Princeton High School with 1,555 students in grades 9-12
Frank Chmiel, Principal

Former, renamed and converted schools
Witherspoon Street School for Colored Children, educated the African-American students of Princeton from 1858 until desegregation in 1948.
Valley Road School educated children in Princeton Township from 1918 until 1980 when it was converted to offices. It was the first school constructed in the former Princeton Township by the regional district and became the district's first integrated elementary school in 1948.
John Witherspoon Middle School was the former name of Princeton Middle School from its construction in 1966 to 2020. The name was changed on June 15, 2020, with a vote of 8-1 from the Princeton Public Schools School Board following the George Floyd protests, due to the school's namesake being a slave owner. The school was renamed Princeton Middle School in 2021 after temporarily being named Princeton Unified Middle School for the 2020-2021 school year.

Administration
Core members of the district's administration are:
Dr. Carol Kelley, Superintendent
Matthew Bouldin, Business Administrator / Board Secretary

Board of education
The district's board of education, comprised of nine members, sets policy and oversees the fiscal and educational operation of the district through its administration. As a Type II school district, the board's trustees are elected directly by voters to serve three-year terms of office on a staggered basis, with three seats up for election each year held (since 2013) as part of the November general election. The board appoints a superintendent to oversee the district's day-to-day operations and a business administrator to supervise the business functions of the district. A tenth represented is appointed by the Cranbury district to represent its interests on the Princeton Board of Education.

References

External links
Princeton Public Schools

School Data for the Princeton Public Schools, National Center for Education Statistics

Schools in Princeton, New Jersey
New Jersey District Factor Group I
School districts in Mercer County, New Jersey